Ananyino is a rural locality (a selo) and the administrative center of Ananyinskoye Rural Settlement, Chernushinsky District, Perm Krai, Russia. The population was 568 as of 2010. There are 12 streets.

Geography 
Ananyino is located 12 km north of Chernushka (the district's administrative centre) by road. Malanichi is the nearest rural locality.

References 

Rural localities in Chernushinsky District